Window on Main Street is an American comedy-drama television series starring Robert Young about an author who returns to his home town after an absence of many years to write about the people and events there. Original episodes aired from October 2, 1961, until May 23, 1962.

Synopsis

Cameron "Cam" Garrett Brooks left his boyhood home town, Millsburg, in 1934, hoping to become a wealthy and famous writer. He lived in New York City, Connecticut, and France, but fortune and fame eluded him. In the aftermath of the death of his wife Selma and their child in an automobile accident on an icy road, he returns to Millsburg in 1961 as a struggling author. He resides in a room on the second story of the Majestic Hotel with a balcony overlooking Main Street, planning to use the people and events he sees on the street as inspiration for stories in a new book he is writing called Window on Main Street. His childhood friend Lloyd Ramsey, now the editor of the town's newspaper, tries to talk him out of it, telling him that the town has changed a great deal since he moved away and little is left of what he remembers from his childhood. Cam remains committed to his plan, however, believing that the people of Millsburg have remarkable stories for him to tell. Each week, he writes a chapter of his book, based on that week's story.

Chris Logan, a widow who works as Lloyd's assistant at the newspaper, is Cam's romantic interest, and Arny is her young son. Harry McGill is the hotel's desk clerk. Other people Cam frequently encounters include Mrs. Miller and her son Roddy, Miss Wycliffe, Dick Aldrich, and Phil Rowan.

In the spring of 1962, the hotel closed temporarily for renovations, and Cam moved in with its owner, Wally Evans, and his wife Peggy.

Cast
Robert Young....Cameron "Cam" Garrett Brooks
Constance Moore....Chris Logan
Ford Rainey....Lloyd Ramsey
Brad Berwick....Arny Logan
James Davidson....Wally Evans
Carol Byron....Peggy Evans
Coleen Gray....Miss Wycliffe
Warner Jones....Harry McGill
Marilyn Harvey...Mrs. Miller
Tim Matheson....Roddy Miller
William Cort...Dick Aldrich
Richard Wyler...Phil Rowan
Mary Adams...Lavinia Webster

Production

After a successful six-season run from 1954 to 1960 in Father Knows Best — prime-time reruns of which still ran on network television during the 1961–1962 season — Robert Young returned to series television in 1961–1962 in Window on Main Street. Roswell Rogers created the show and served as its principal scriptwriter, Young and Eugene B. Rodney co-owned and co-produced it, and Irving "Izzy" Friedman composed the music. Rogers, Rodney, and Friedman had performed the same roles for Father Knows Best. Window on Main Street was filmed at Desilu Studios.

CBS gave Young and Rodney complete creative control over the show, which had a moralizing and sentimental tone very similar to that of Father Knows Best. By not tying the central character, again portrayed by Young, to a domestic situation, however, Window on Main Street allowed the exploration of non-family themes that would not have fit into the premise of Father Knows Best. Window on Main Street never gained the audience of Father Knows Best and lasted for only one season.

Broadcast history

Window on Main Street premiered on CBS on October 2, 1961, airing on Mondays at 8:30 p.m. In mid-February 1962 it moved to 8:00 p.m. on Wednesdays, where it remained for the rest of its run. CBS cancelled it after only one season, and its last original episode aired on May 23, 1962.

After the show ended, CBS broadcast prime-time reruns of Window on Main Street during its normal Wednesday time slot The last prime-time rerun aired on September 12, 1962.

Episodes
Source:

References

External links
"Remembering some of The Cast from This 1961 Classic TV Show: Window on Main Street" on YouTube
Window on Main Street episode "The Editor's Daughter" at Daily Motion
Window on Main Street episode "Christmas Memory" on Facebook

CBS original programming
1960s American comedy-drama television series
1961 American television series debuts
1962 American television series endings
Television shows about writers
Television series about widowhood
Television series set in 1961